Chuang Chuang and Lin Hui are two giant pandas from Sichuan, China on loan to Chiang Mai Zoo in Chiang Mai, Thailand.

History 
Chuang Chuang, male, was born on August 6, 2000 at the China Conservation and Research Center for Giant Pandas in Wolong, Sichuan province, China. Chuang Chuang's mother is Bai Xue and his father is Xin Xing.

Lin Hui, female, was born on September 28, 2001, also from the China Conservation and Research Center for Giant Pandas in Wolong. Lin Hui's mother is Tang Tang and her father is Pan Pan.

The pandas arrived at Chiang Mai Zoo on October 12, 2003 to begin a 10-year conservation program to breed giant pandas.

Chuang Chuang and Linhui successfully artificially bred and produced an offspring named Lin Ping. The baby panda Lin Ping, female, was born on May 27, 2009 also resides in Chiang Mai Zoo.

Chuang Chuang died on 16 September, 2019, in his enclosure. Officials said that he collapsed shortly after standing up following a meal of bamboo leaves.

Names

References

External links 
 

Individual giant pandas

th:ช่วงช่วง
zh:创创